Elections to Stoke-on-Trent City Council took place on 5 May 2011. This election was the first following an Electoral Review by the Local Government Boundary Commission for England. The total number of councillors became 44 (down from 60) in a mixture of single and multi-member wards (31 single member wards, 5 two member wards and 1 three member ward). The former election by thirds (i.e., one third of councillors up for election in each of three years out of a four-year cycle) was replaced by whole council election every fourth year.

Election result
After the election, the parties were represented thus: Labour 34 seats; Conservative 2 seats; Others (independents and "unaffiliated") 8 seats. After several years as a minority party, Labour had acquired a dominant majority of seats. A notable feature of this result was the elimination of Liberal Democrat representation and that of various right-wing populist parties. The second largest political "grouping" is of Independent councillors.

|- style="background-color:#F6F6F6"
| colspan="7" style="text-align: right; margin-right: 0.5em" | Turnout
| style="text-align: right; margin-right: 0.5em" | 
| style="text-align: right; margin-right: 0.5em" | 
| style="text-align: right; margin-right: 0.5em" |
|-

The net change column is a comparison with the preceding council, which was 16 members larger. It was, therefore, possible for every party or group to have lost seats. Shares of the votes are based upon accepted votes cast (in multi-member wards, an elector is not obliged to use all votes to which they are entitled).

Ward results
Elected candidates are in bold. Previously sitting councillors (on the old 60 member council) marked by "*".

References

2011 English local elections
2011
2010s in Staffordshire